The 1928 Republican National Convention was held at Convention Hall in Kansas City, Missouri, from June 12 to June 15, 1928.

Because President Coolidge had announced unexpectedly he would not run for re-election in 1928, Commerce Secretary Herbert Clark Hoover became the natural front-runner for the Republican nomination. Former Illinois Governor Frank Lowden and Kansas Senator Charles Curtis were candidates for the nomination but stood no chance against the popular and accomplished Hoover. Chicago Mayor William Hale Thompson considered himself a candidate, but without the support of Ruth Hanna McCormick, his candidacy was unsuccessful.

Hoover was nominated on the first ballot with 837 votes to 72 for Lowden and 64 for Curtis and the rest scattered. John L. McNab delivered Hoover's nomination address.

In his acceptance speech he said, "We in America today are nearer to the final triumph over poverty ever before in the history of any land."

That and other optimistic remarks about the country's future were used against him in the 1932 election, which he lost to Franklin Roosevelt.

Background 
After Coolidge announced that he would not run for a second full term in August 1927, Hoover emerged as the frontrunner. Illinois Governor Frank Lowden, Vice President Charles Dawes, and Senators James Eli Watson of Indiana, Charles Curtis of Kansas, Guy D. Goff of West Virginia, and Frank Willis of Ohio also loomed as potential challengers to Hoover.

Hoover had won respect by many for his work in the Wilson, Harding, and Coolidge administrations, but many party regulars distrusted his loyalty to the party on issues of both policy and patronage. Some progressive Republicans, such as California Senator Hiram Johnson, also disliked Hoover, but others, such as Senator William E. Borah, favored Hoover's candidacy. Many party leaders pressured Secretary of the Treasury Andrew Mellon to run, but at 73, Mellon felt that he was too old to run in 1928. Mellon sought to convince former Secretary of State and 1916 Republican nominee Charles Evans Hughes to run, but Hughes refused to campaign for the nomination.

Platform 
The platform praised the Coolidge administration for the prosperity of the mid-1920s, and also promised reduction of the national debt, tax reduction, retention of the protective tariff, opposition of cancellation of foreign debts, settlement of claims from World War I from foreign governments, continuation of the Coolidge foreign policy, support of arbitration treaties, civil service protection, a tariff for agricultural protection and continued farm exports, aid to the coal-mining industry, continued appropriations for highway construction, the right to collective bargaining, regulation of railroads, a continued independent American merchant marine, government supervision of radio facilities, construction of waterways to help transportation of bulk goods, support for war veterans, federal regulation of public utilities, conservation, vigorous law enforcement, honest government, continued reclamation of arid lands in the West, improvement of air-mail service, restricted immigration and naturalization of foreign immigrants in America, continued enforcement of the Washington Naval Treaty, continued status of territory status for Alaska and Hawaii and called for more women in public service, right of the President to draft defense material resources and services, creation of an Indian Commission, an Anti-Lynching Law and promised continued Home-Rule for the American Citizen.

Hoover's forces won an early victory by securing adoption of an agricultural plank which endorse President Coolidge's attitude on the question and rejected all principles of the McNary–Haugen Farm Relief Bill. Former Governor Lowden caused a sensation that left the convention a little dumbfounded by announcing that since the agricultural plank was unsatisfactory he withdrew his name from before the convention as a presidential aspirant.

Presidential nomination

Presidential candidates 

With no strong alternative, Hoover appeared to be the likely nominee at the start of the convention, but many in the party still opposed his candidacy. A "draft Coolidge" movement emerged, but the movement collapsed once it became clear that Coolidge would not run again. With Coolidge out of the running, Senate Majority Leader Charles Curtis tried to rally Hoover's rivals around his own candidacy. However, Hoover won the nomination on the first ballot.

Presidential Balloting / 3rd Day of Convention (June 14, 1928)

Vice Presidential nomination

Vice Presidential candidates 

At the start of the convention, Vice President Charles G. Dawes, former Kansas Governor Henry Justin Allen, New Jersey Senator Walter Edge, New Hampshire Senator George H. Moses, Connecticut Representative John Q. Tilson, and Ambassador Alanson B. Houghton were mentioned as potential running mates for Hoover. Kansas Senator Charles Curtis was also mentioned as a possibility, but he was not yet ready to concede the presidential nomination to Hoover.

After Hoover won the presidential nomination, Moses, Illinois Senator Charles S. Deneen, and former Massachusetts Governor Channing Cox were named as the most likely vice-presidential nominees, with a re-nomination for Dawes also a possibility. Party leaders considered nominating Cox or Dawes, but Cox was vetoed by Utah Senator Reed Smoot, and Dawes was unacceptable to Hoover and Coolidge for supporting McNary-Haugen.

The convention turned to the farm vote in hopes of placating them for the unfavorably received farm relief plank. Curtis' name was entered by Senator Borah and his nomination was practically assured since the Lion of Idaho and other westerners had issued an ultimatum that a western must hold the vice presidency to placate the farmers. The Senate Majority Leader voted for the McNary-Haugen Bill which President Coolidge vetoed, but had refused to vote to override the veto of that measure. Curtis, possibly with the support of Coolidge, was nominated by the party leaders, and the convention ratified the choice.

Prayers 
Each of the four days of the convention opened with a lengthy invocation by a different clergymen—one Jewish, one Catholic, one Episcopalian, one Methodist. Together, these four religious groups formed a majority of Americans at the time.

All of the clergy were based in Missouri, where the convention was held. Each was listed among the convention officers as an official chaplain.

On June 12, the opening prayer was given by Bishop S. C. Partridge of the Episcopal Diocese of West Missouri. Speakers on the second through fourth days were Catholic Bishop Thomas F. Lillis of the Diocese of Kansas City, Rabbi Herman M. Cohen of Congregation Keneseth Israel-Beth Sholom, Kansas City, and Bishop E. L. Waldorf of the Methodist Episcopal Diocese of Kansas City.

See also 
 History of the United States Republican Party
 List of Republican National Conventions
 U.S. presidential nomination convention
 Republican Party presidential primaries, 1928
 1928 United States presidential election
 1928 Democratic National Convention

References

External links 
 Republican Party platform of 1928 at The American Presidency Project

1928 United States presidential election
Republican National Conventions
Republican National Convention, 1928
Political conventions in Missouri
1928 in Missouri
1928 conferences
June 1928 events
Conventions in St. Louis